Cyperus rehmii is a species of sedge that is native to parts of Namibia.

See also 
 List of Cyperus species

References 

rehmii
Plants described in 1951
Flora of Namibia
Taxa named by Hermann Merxmüller